Towanda Township is a township in Butler County, Kansas, USA.  As of the 2000 census, its population was 2,727.

History
Towanda Township was established in 1867. Towanda is an Osage-language name meaning "many waters".

Geography
According to the USGS, it contains one cemetery, Sutton.

The streams of Badger Creek, Spring Branch and West Branch Whitewater River run through this township.

Transportation
Towanda Township contains one airport or landing strip, Greer Miller Landing Strip.

Further reading

References

 USGS Geographic Names Information System (GNIS)

External links
 City-Data.com

Townships in Butler County, Kansas
Townships in Kansas